The Roosevelt Island Bridge is a tower drive vertical lift bridge that connects Roosevelt Island in Manhattan to Astoria in Queens, crossing the East Channel of the East River.  It is the sole route to the island for vehicular and foot traffic (without using public transportation).

History
Construction of the bridge began on March 17, 1952, at a cost of $6.5 million. It opened on May 18, 1955, as the Welfare Island Bridge. The name was changed to the Roosevelt Island Bridge in 1973.

Before the bridge was constructed, the only way vehicles could access Roosevelt Island was via an elevator on the Queensboro Bridge. The elevator was subsequently demolished in 1970.

The Roosevelt Island Bridge provides direct access to the Motorgate Parking Garage, which was designed to minimize vehicular traffic on the island. The garage was completed in 1974 and later expanded in 1990.

In 2001, the New York City Department of Transportation considered converting the Roosevelt Island Bridge into a fixed bridge to reduce the cost of its maintenance. The bridge is rarely opened, because most vessels passing by Roosevelt Island use the West Channel of the East River. Most of the bridge openings occur in September during the General Assembly at the United Nations when the West Channel is closed for security reasons.

See also
Roosevelt Island Tramway

References

External links

Roosevelt Island Bridge

Vertical lift bridges in New York City
Bridges completed in 1955
Roosevelt Island
Road bridges in New York City
Bridges in Queens, New York
Pedestrian bridges in New York City
Bridges in Manhattan
1955 establishments in New York City